Civilian Conservation Corps South Dakota was created to solve unemployment and deteriorating national resources. In South Dakota the Civilian Conservation Corps (CCC) provided work for 23,709 enrollees and veterans, 4,554 Indians, and 2834 supervisory and office personnel. It distributed $6,200,000 in allotment checks to South Dakota families.

CCC camps were located across South Dakota but the major concentration was in the Black Hills. Dams, roads, fences, bridges, signage, campgrounds and the list of achievements is a long one. Several of the men that worked in the Civilian Conservation Corps in South Dakota mentioned working at or near  Mount Rushmore National Memorial. Some of these men worked for Gutzon Borglum before or after CCC service.

References

Civilian Conservation Corps in South Dakota
History of South Dakota